is a fictional character and the protagonist of Konami's action-adventure games Castlevania: Aria of Sorrow and Castlevania: Dawn of Sorrow, part of Konami's Castlevania video game series. He was designed by Ayami Kojima as part of producer Koji Igarashi's desire to try a "different route" for the Castlevania series. His return in Dawn of Sorrow was due to Igarashi's satisfaction with Soma and the storyline in Aria of Sorrow, and he was redesigned with a new anime appearance.

In Aria of Sorrow, Soma is an 18-year-old transfer student studying in Japan (or simply a Japanese high school student, in the Japanese version), where he finds himself in the castle of Dracula, the principal antagonist of the Castlevania series. Soma discovers his "power of dominance," or his ability to claim the souls and abilities of the monsters he defeats as his own. As the game's story progresses, Soma learns of Dracula's demise, and that he is his reincarnation, and destined to become Dracula again (a position Graham Jones desired for himself before he was killed by Soma). The only reason he did not become the next dark lord immediately was due to the efforts of Alucard, using the pseudonym Genya Arikado. Soma eventually defeats the chaos running through the castle, narrowly missing both his own corruption and his possible death at the hands of Julius Belmont. Dawn of Sorrow features Soma fighting the attempts of a cult to slay him and create a new dark lord when one did not surface during the events of Aria of Sorrow.

Several video game publications have praised Soma's character. Although Soma himself was viewed as a stereotypical echo of previous Castlevania protagonists, the new context that the storyline Aria of Sorrow and Dawn of Sorrow provided for him rectified this. The storyline in particular that Soma was situated in was compared to the storyline of the widely acclaimed Castlevania: Symphony of the Night. The switch to an anime character design in Dawn of Sorrow was notably criticized, as many reviewers preferred the designs made by Ayami Kojima.

Conception and design
Soma debuted in Castlevania: Aria of Sorrow, the third installment of the Castlevania series on the Game Boy Advance. He was created as part of the attempt by Koji Igarashi, the producer of several Castlevania games, including the highly acclaimed Castlevania: Symphony of the Night, to try a "different route" for the series by setting it in a futuristic setting. Soma was designed by Ayami Kojima, who had previously worked on the characters in Castlevania games such as Castlevania: Symphony of the Night and Castlevania: Harmony of Dissonance. Kojima's drawings are made in a dark, gothic style, and borrow heavily from bishōnen-style art. Nevertheless, keeping with Igarashi's "different route" motif, Soma's appearance was made noticeably more contemporary, sporting more modern clothing in comparison to the medieval attire of characters in previous Castlevania games.

Soma's inclusion in Dawn of Sorrow, a rare sequel in the Castlevania series, was made by Igarashi, who stated that one of his primary motivations behind making Dawn of Sorrow was to feature Soma Cruz in another game. Ayami Kojima was not included in the production team, as Igarashi wanted her to concentrate on her character designs for Castlevania: Curse of Darkness. Soma, along with the remainder of the characters, were redrawn in an anime style. This was a marketing strategy Igarashi wished to employ, as he felt that the Nintendo DS' target demographic was significantly younger than those of other consoles Castlevania games had appeared on, and he intended to court them with a more simplistic anime design. Furthermore, Igarashi considered it a litmus test for whether the design would be incorporated into future Castlevania installments.

Appearances

In Aria of Sorrow, Soma is depicted as a high school student in Japan, living peacefully with his childhood friend Mina Hakuba. He is drawn into Dracula's castle, where he learns of his "power of dominance", enabling him to absorb the souls of the monsters he defeats and use their abilities. As he proceeds through Dracula's castle, he learns that Dracula, the longtime antagonist of the Castlevania series, had been truly defeated, and that a prophecy had been made dictating that Dracula's powers would be passed down to his reincarnation. After defeating Graham Jones, who had harbored the notion that he was Dracula's reincarnation, Soma realizes that he himself is Dracula's reincarnation. As a result, he is confronted by Julius Belmont, the latest member of the Belmont clan, a group of vampire hunters sworn to hunt Dracula until his demise. Soma defeats Julius, and extracts a promise from him to slay him should he fail to subdue Dracula's spirit. With the aid of the allies he encountered throughout the castle, he is able to escape his fate by defeating the manifestation of the castle's chaos.

Soma's second appearance is in Dawn of Sorrow, where he returns into battle to combat Celia Fortner's cult, which seeks to kill Soma and revive the dark lord. Although Soma believes that his powers have been lost, they awaken, and he proceeds to a replica of Dracula's castle in order to confront Celia's cult. In the castle, Soma learns of the "dark lord's candidates", who were born on the day of Dracula's demise and possess supernatural powers as a result. Soma manages to best the first candidate, Dmitrii Blinov, although he inadvertently absorbs Dmitrii's soul in the process. Soma proceeds to defeat Dario Bossi in two instances, stripping him of his power after the conclusion of their second fight. As a result, Celia slays a doppelgänger of Mina to induce Soma to become the dark lord, but fails due to a talisman Mina gave him earlier in the game. Dmitrii's soul escapes from Soma's body into the doppelgänger, and he increases his powers, having copied Soma's power of dominance. Soma manages to defeat his monstrous form "Menace", and realizes at the end of the game that his fate is his own to determine. Soma additionally appears in the "Julius Mode" found in Dawn of Sorrow, where the storyline follows the assumption that Soma succumbed to his darker nature and became the new dark lord. He is the final boss of Julius Mode.

Reception
Soma's character has received praise and criticism from several video game publications. GameSpy noted that although Soma fell into the stereotypical role of "an effeminate-looking man who does all the slaying", the original scenario that Aria of Sorrow presented provided a better context for his character. The fact that Soma was not a member of the Belmont clan, the protagonists of most Castlevania games, was lauded by IGN and RPGamer, with the latter commenting on how it contributed to the "depth" of the storyline. The manner in which Soma's "power of dominance" translated into the Tactical Soul system featured in both games was widely acclaimed; IGN commented that it contributed "significantly" to the overall feel of Aria of Sorrow, and RPGamer celebrated the "triumphant return" of the Tactical Soul system in Dawn of Sorrow. Reviewers also complimented Soma's graphical representation. GameSpy noted the "good animation on easily viewable sprites" in Aria of Sorrow, and GameSpot called the graphics in Dawn of Sorrow "intricate and gorgeous", making note of the character sprites. The change to an anime design in Dawn of Sorrow was criticized. GameSpy deplored the "shallow, lifeless anime images" used for Soma's in-game representation, and Kojima's absence from the production. IGN claimed that the images were "down to the level of 'generic Saturday morning Anime' quality". Nevertheless, RPGFan felt that the story created around Soma was the best presented in the series since Symphony of the Night. 

One of the main developers from the Netflix Castlevania series, executive producer Adi Shankar, has expressed a desire in using Soma, considering him an underrated character. He further added "When you look at the story of Soma Cruz, and really what we’re doing here, the difference between the gaming universe and the Castlevania cinematic universe, we are adding emotional depth, and to extrapolate from Soma Cruz there's a lot to unpack there -- and I’m not spoiling it, I’m just saying I personally just really dig Soma Cruz."

References

Castlevania characters
Dracula in written fiction
Fictional Japanese people
Fictional monster hunters
Fictional swordfighters in video games
Konami protagonists
Male characters in video games
Fiction about reincarnation
Video game characters introduced in 2003